Herapathite, or iodoquinine sulfate, is a chemical compound whose crystals are dichroic and thus can be used for polarizing light.

It was discovered in 1852 by William Bird Herapath, a Bristol surgeon and chemist. One of his pupils found that adding iodine to the urine of a dog that had been fed quinine produced unusual green crystals. Herapath noticed while studying the crystals under a microscope that they appeared to polarize light.

In the 1930s,  invented a process to grow single herapathite crystals large enough to be sandwiched between two sheets of glass to create a polarizing filter; these were sold under the Bernotar name by Carl Zeiss. Herapathite can be formed by precipitation by dissolving quinine sulfate in acetic acid and adding iodine tincture.

Herapathite's dichroic properties came to the attention of Sir David Brewster, and were later used by Edwin H. Land in 1929 to construct the first type of Polaroid sheet polarizer. He did this by embedding herapathite crystals in a polymer instead of growing a single large crystal.

Structurally, herapathite consists of quinine (in a cationic doubly-protonated ammonium form), sulfate counterions, and triiodide units, all as a hydrate. They combine as 4C20H26N2O2•3SO4•2I3•6H2O, or sometimes other ratios and higher polyiodides.

References

Further reading
 Bernauer, F. (1935). "Neue Wege zur Herstellung von Polarisatoren". Forschritte der Mineralogie, Kristallographie und Petrographie Neunzehnter Band.
 
 

Nitrogen heterocycles
Organoiodides
Polarization (waves)
Vinyl compounds